Chełm is an administrative district (dzielnica administracyjna) of the city of Gdańsk, Poland. It got its final shape in 2019.

Location 
From the north, the quarter is bordered by the districts of Siedlce and Śródmieście, from the east by Orunia-Św. Wojciech-Lipce, from the south by Orunia Górna-Gdańsk Południe and Ujeścisko-Łostowice and from the west by Wzgórze Mickiewicza.

The quarters of Chełm are:
 Stary Chełm (translated Old Chełm)
 Nowy Chełm (translated New Chełm)

Quarters of the larger district Chełm transferred to Orunia Górna-Gdańsk Południe had been:
 Orunia Górna (translated Upper Orunia)
 Maćkowy
 Borkowo, with:
 Cztery Pory Roku (translated Four Seasons of the Year)
 Moje Marzenie (My Dream)
 Os. Kolorowe (Colourful [estate]).

History 
As part of the Kingdom of Poland it was a private church village of the Roman Catholic Diocese of Włocławek, administratively located in the Gdańsk County in the Pomeranian Voivodeship.

During the German occupation (World War II), a subcamp of the Stalag XX-B prisoner-of-war camp was operated in the district. On average, the Germans held about 600 Allied POWs in the camp.

In 2010, the fast growing district of Chełm i Gdańsk Południe with a population of about 72,000 has been divided in the districts of Chełm and Ujeścisko-Łostowice. When Chełm reached a population of 51,000, the city council decided on August 30, 2018 for a second division in the smaller district of Chełm and the district Orunia Górna-Gdańsk Południe. The new district was created on March 24, 2019.

Tourism 
Tourist attractions:
 Jewish Chełm-Gdańsk Cemetery (Cmentarz Żydowski), closed in 1956
 The modern church św. Urszuli Ledóchowskiej
 The modern church pw. Krzyża Świętego.

References

External links 

 Podział administracyjny Gdańska (Polish)
 gedanopedia.pl: Chełm (Polish)
 gedanopedia.pl: Orunia Górna (Polish)

Districts of Gdańsk